Cheryl Carolus (born 27 May 1958) is a South African politician. She was born in Silvertown, on the Cape Flats, Cape Town. Carolus became involved in politics while still at school and became an activist after joining the United Democratic Front in 1983. In May 1990, Carolus was elected to be part of the African National Congress' delegation which held talks with the apartheid government and in July 1991, she was elected to the ANC's National Executive Committee. She was married to Graeme Bloch, who died in 2021. In 1998, she became South Africa's High Commissioner in London. Between 2001 and 2004, she was the chief executive officer of SA Tourism (SATOUR). She was the Board Chairperson for South African National Parks (SANPARKS), in 2009 she assumed this position at South African Airways. She is also chairperson of Peotona Holdings, an investment company that deals with business development.

Carolus is a member of the Executive Committee of the International Crisis Group. In 2015 she was a Trustee of the British Museum.

On 5 May 2018 the bodies of her husband's (Graeme Bloch) parents were discovered in Cape Town. They had been tied up and murdered.

References

External links 
 http://www.whoswhosa.co.za/Pages/profilefull.aspx?IndID=4603

1958 births
Living people
Politicians from Cape Town
Cape Coloureds
Members of the African National Congress
High Commissioners of South Africa to the United Kingdom
Trustees of the British Museum